The Arialah class are patrol boats for the United Arab Emirates Critical Infrastructure and Coastal Protection Agency (CICPA). Two ships are planned for this class.

Description
The class was designed by Damen Group, based on its "sea axe" design. The hull was constructed at Damen's Galați shipyard in Romania, with fit out by Abu Dhabi Ship Building and systems integration by Thales Group.

History
The contract was originally awarded in December 2013. The lead ship Arialah (P6701) was handed over to CICPA on 21 February 2017 and commissioned the same year. The second off-shore patrol boat in the class, Hmeem (P6702), was commissioned a year later in 2018.

Ships in class

Gallery

See also
 United Arab Emirates Navy

References

External links
 Abu Dhabi Ship Building
 Arialah Class (6711 OPV)
 Strange-looking UAE Warship with ‘Sea Axe Bow’ Draws Attention at IDEX 2017
 Arialah

Patrol boat classes